Nathpora, also known as Nathpur, is a village in Bandipora district of the Indian union territory of Jammu and Kashmir.

References

Villages in Bandipora district